Extinction, in biology and palaeontology, is the end of a species or other taxon.

Extinction may also refer to:

Science 
 Mass extinction, or extinction event, a widespread and rapid decrease in the amount of life on earth
 Human extinction (end of the human species)
 Language extinction, or language death
 Extinction (another word for attenuation), in physical sciences
 Extinction coefficient (another term for mass attenuation coefficient), in physical sciences
 Extinction (astronomy)
 Extinction (optical mineralogy), when cross-polarized light dims, as viewed through a thin section of a mineral in a petrographic microscope
 Bird's eye extinction, in optical mineralogy
 Undulose extinction, a geological term
Ewald–Oseen extinction theorem in optics, when light changes media  
Extinction (psychology), when a conditioned response is reduced or lost
Extinction (neurology), a neurological disorder that impairs the ability to perceive multiple stimuli of the same type simultaneously

Film and television 
"Extinction" (Star Trek: Enterprise), television episode
"Extinction" (Smallville episode), television episode
Resident Evil: Extinction, a 2007 film starring Milla Jovovich
Transformers: Age of Extinction, a 2014 Transformers film
Extinction (2015 film), a 2015 film starring Matthew Fox
Extinction (2018 film), a 2018 science fiction thriller film

Literature 
Extinction (Forgotten Realms novel), a fantasy novel by Lisa Smedman
 Extinction (Bernhard novel), a 1986 novel by Thomas Bernhard
Extinction, a science fiction novel by Ray Hammond

Video games 
"Extinction", a game mode in the video game Call of Duty: Ghosts
Aliens Versus Predator: Extinction, a 2003 video game for PlayStation 2 and Xbox
Extinction (video game), a 2018 action game by Iron Galaxy

Other uses 
 Extinction (peerage), in the United Kingdom, happens when all possible heirs of a peer have died out
"Extinction", a song by Stigmata from the album Hollow Dreams
Extinction (album), a 1990 album by Nausea
 Extinction Rebellion, environmental campaign

See also 

 Extinct (disambiguation)
 Extinction Event (disambiguation)
 Extinction Level Event (disambiguation)